Richard Grayson may refer to:

 Dick Grayson, a DC Comics fictional character
 Richard Grayson (composer) (1941–2016), pianist and composer
 Richard Grayson (writer) (born 1951), political activist
 Richard Grayson (artist) (born 1958), British artist, writer and curator
 Richard Grayson (academic) (born 1969), professor, political activist and commentator

See also
Richard Grason (1820–1893), judge of the Maryland Court of Appeals